Evelyn Abbott (10 March 1843 – 3 September 1901) was an English classical scholar, born at Epperstone, Nottinghamshire. He was educated at Balliol College, Oxford, where he excelled both academically and in sports, winning the Gaisford Prize for Greek Verse in 1864, but after a fall in 1866 his legs became paralysed. He managed to graduate in spite of his handicap, and was elected fellow of Balliol in 1874. His best-known work is his History of Greece in three volumes (1888–1900), where he presents a sceptical view of the Iliad and the Odyssey. Among his other works are Elements of Greek Accidence (1874), and translations of several German books on ancient history, language and philosophy. He was the founding editor of the Heroes of the Nations book series. Abbott died at Knotsford Lodge, Great Malvern, in 1901, and was buried at Redlands Cemetery, near Cardiff.

Selected publications

Easy Greek reader. Oxford: Clarendon Press, 1886.
 (3 vols. 1888–1900)

as translator:  (6 vols. 1877–1882 from the German original Geschichte des Alterthums in 4 vols., 1852–1857, by Max Duncker)
as translator with Sarah Frances Alleyne:  (from German original Die Philosophie der Griechen in ihrer geschichtlichen Entwicklung by Eduard Zeller)
as editor with Lewis Campbell:

References
James Leigh Strachan-Davidson, Abbott, Evelyn (1843–1901), rev. M. C. Curthoys, Oxford Dictionary of National Biography, (Oxford, 2004).
James Leigh Strachan-Davidson, Abbott, Evelyn, in: Dictionary of National Biography (DNB), Supplement volume 1 of 1912, pp. 3–4 (online).

External links

1843 births
1901 deaths
People from Epperstone
English classical scholars
Alumni of Balliol College, Oxford
Fellows of Balliol College, Oxford
Classical scholars of the University of Oxford
Scholars of ancient Greek history
People educated at Lincoln Grammar School